Cavaleiros do Forró is a Brazilian Forró band formed in Natal, Rio Grande do Norte in 2004. The group has sold more than 2.5 million albums.

Discography

References

External links 
 Official website

2001 establishments in Brazil
Musical groups established in 2001
Portuguese-language singers
Brazilian musical groups
Musical groups from Natal